The 51st NAACP Image Awards, presented by the NAACP, honored outstanding representations and achievements of people of color in motion pictures, television, music, and literature during the 2019 calendar year. The ceremony took place on February 22, 2020, at the Pasadena Civic Auditorium and was broadcast for the first time on BET - as well as simulcast on several of its sister ViacomCBS networks, moving to the former after broadcasts on TV One in previous years.

During the ceremony Rihanna was awarded with the President's Award for "her fundraising efforts with various charities, disaster relief and education abroad—efforts", and John Lewis was awarded with the Chairman's Award "in recognition of his lifelong dedication of protecting human rights and securing civil liberties".

All nominees are listed below, and the winners are listed in bold.

Special Awards

Motion Picture

Television

Recording

Outstanding New Artist
 Lil Nas X
 Ari Lennox
 Lucky Daye
 Mahalia
 Mykal Kilgore

Outstanding Male Artist
 Bruno Mars
 Khalid
 Lil Nas X
 MAJOR.
 PJ Morton

Outstanding Female Artist
 Beyoncé
 Fantasia
 H.E.R.
 India.Arie
 Lizzo

Outstanding Duo, Group or Collaboration
 Blue Ivy, Saint Jhn, Beyoncé & Wizkid – "Brown Skin Girl"
 Chris Brown feat. Drake – "No Guidance"
 PJ Morton feat. JoJo – "Say So"
 Ari Lennox & J. Cole – "Shea Butter Baby"
 Alicia Keys & Miguel – "Show Me Love"

Outstanding Jazz Album
 Jazzmeia Horn – Love & Liberation"
 David Sánchez – Carib
 Najee – Center of the Heart
 Nathan Mitchell – SoulMate
 Vanessa Rubin – The Dream Is You: Vanessa Rubin Sings Tadd Dameron

Outstanding Gospel/Christian Song – Traditional or Contemporary
 Kirk Franklin – Love Theory"
 John P. Kee feat. Zacardi Cortez – I Made It Out
 BeBe Winans feat. Korean Soul – Laughter
 Donnie McClurkin – Not Yet
 The Clark Sisters – Victory

Outstanding Music Video
 Lizzo – "Juice"
 H.E.R. – "Hard Place"
 Chris Brown feat. Drake – "No Guidance"
 India Arie – "Steady Love"
 Khalid – "Talk"

Outstanding Song, Traditional
 Beyoncé – "Spirit"
 Fantasia – "Enough"
 Lizzo – "Jerome"
 Cynthia Erivo – "Stand Up"
 India Arie – "Steady Love"

Outstanding Song, Contemporary
 Beyoncé – "Before I Let Go"
 H.E.R. – "Hard Place"
 Lizzo – "Juice"
 Normani – "Motivation"
 Khalid – "Talk"

Outstanding Album
 Beyoncé – Homecoming: The Live Album
 Lizzo – Cuz I Love You
 H.E.R. – I Used to Know Her
 Fantasia – Sketchbook
 India Arie – Worthy

Outstanding Soundtrack/Compilation
 Beyoncé & Various artists – The Lion King: The Gift
 Terence Blanchard – Harriet (Original Motion Picture Soundtrack)
 Various artists – Queen & Slim: The Soundtrack
 Various artists – The Lion King: Original Motion Picture Soundtrack
 Michael Abels – Us (Original Motion Picture Soundtrack)

References

External links
 NAACP Image Awards official site

NAACP Image Awards
N
N
N
NAACP Image